Agys Ramsaran Verma  is an Indian politician and a former Member of the Uttar Pradesh Legislative Assembly. He represents the Bisalpur constituency of Uttar Pradesh and is a member of the Bharatiya Janata Party political party.

Early life and  education
Agys Ramsaran Verma  was  born in Shahjahanpur district. He attended the Bareilly College and attained Bachelor of Arts & Bachelor of Laws degrees.

Political career
Agys Ramsaran Verma was a MLA for four terms. He represented the Bisalpur constituency and is a member of the Bharatiya Janata Party political party.

See also
 Bisalpur (Assembly constituency)
 Sixteenth Legislative Assembly of Uttar Pradesh
 Uttar Pradesh Legislative Assembly

References 

Bharatiya Janata Party politicians from Uttar Pradesh
Uttar Pradesh MLAs 1991–1993
Uttar Pradesh MLAs 1993–1996
Uttar Pradesh MLAs 2012–2017
Uttar Pradesh MLAs 2017–2022
People from Pilibhit district
1949 births
Living people